The 1999–2000 season was the 91st season in the existence of Levante UD and the club's first season back in the second division of Spanish football.

Competitions

Overall record

Segunda División

League table

Results summary

Results by round

Matches

Source:

Copa del Rey

Preliminary round

References

Levante UD seasons
Levante